The 1982-83 NBA season was the Bulls' 17th season in the NBA.

Draft picks

Roster

Regular season

Season standings

z - clinched division title
y - clinched division title
x - clinched playoff spot

Record vs. opponents

Game log

Player statistics

Season

Awards and records
 Quintin Dailey, NBA All-Rookie Team 1st Team
 Reggie Theus, NBA All-Star Game

Transactions

References

See also
 1982-83 NBA season

Chicago Bulls seasons
C
Chicago Bulls
Chicago Bulls